Molecular Playground is a project initiated by researchers at University of Massachusetts Amherst whose goal is to expose the molecular aspect of nature to the public by the use of a system which displays interactive molecule simulations in public areas.

External links
 Official project website
There are Molecular Playground installations at:
 University of Massachusetts Amherst, Integrated Sciences Building - Amherst, MA 01003, USA.
 The Springfield Science Museum - Springfield, MA 01103, USA.
 St. Olaf College, Regents Hall of Natural and Mathematical Sciences - Northfield, MN 55057, USA.
 Okinawa Institute of Science & Technology - Onna-son, Kunigami-gun, Okinawa, Japan.
 Gilead Sciences Inc. - Foster City, CA 94404, USA.
 University of Alcalá, School of Pharmacy - 28806 Alcalá de Henares (Madrid), Spain.

University of Massachusetts Amherst